Alan Pipes  (born 19 March 1947 in Bury, Lancashire, England) is a British writer on art, product design and graphic design. He studied physics at the University of Surrey, in Battersea and worked in print publishing, notably as Managing Editor of Computer-Aided Design journal (1977–82), published by IPC Science and Technology Press (then Butterworth-Heinemann), and editor of CadCam International (1982–85), published by EMAP, before becoming a freelance writer in 1985.

Pipes's college textbooks have become standards in their field, with Production For Graphic Designers currently in its 5th printing. Also known as Fred Pipes or Alan (Fred) Pipes (so named after his resemblance to Freddie Garrity singer with the Manchester band Freddie and the Dreamers), he is also a cartoon illustrator, an artist and printmaker, exhibiting regularly in the Brighton, Adur and Worthing Artists Open House festivals since 1996. He has been a committee member of the Brighton Illustrators Group since 1990 and has been webmaster of Channel 4's archaeology television programme Time Team since 1998. He is a Fellow of the Royal Society of Arts.

Pipes also catalogues short, unusual and misplaced cycle lanes on a website, Weird Cycle Lanes. According to an article about it in  The Daily Telegraph, 'Some people collect stamps, some people collect beermats, but Alan Pipes collects unusual cycle lanes. He's already acquired a cult following on the South Coast with his web-gallery of improbable, impractical and sometimes impassable bits of municipal road-marking. Now he's expanding his search nationwide to try to find Britain's most ludicrous bus and cycle lanes.'

Published work
As author:

 5th edition. US edition published by Prentice Hall. 
 (2nd edition 2008).

. Reviewed in Design Week, July 19, 2007.

In translation:

As collaborator:
"Engineering design" (with Ian Charteris, Andrew Nahum), Science Museum, 1986.
"Drawing for engineers" (with Paul Grant), Design Council, 1989.

As Editorial Consultant:

"Color" by Edith Anderson Feisner, Laurence King, 2001.
"New Media Design" by Tricia Austin and Richard Doust, Laurence King, 2007.

Fiction

Pipes, Alan (Fred) (2013-4-11). Murder on the Gatwick Express, Vernier Press, .
Pipes, Alan (Fred) (2014). The Fracking Cult Murders, Vernier Press, .

References

External links
The Pipes portal
Laurence King Publishing
Overlook Press
Pearson Higher Education
Weird cycle lanes of Brighton (Archived 2009-10-24)

1947 births
Living people
British illustrators
People from Bury, Greater Manchester